The Glomeraceae are a family of arbuscular mycorrhizal (AM) fungi that form symbiotic relationships (mycorrhizas) with plant roots. The family was circumscribed in 1989.

References

Fungus families
Glomerales